Cassidulus infidus is a species of sea urchin of the family Cassidulidae. Their armour is covered with spines. Cassidulus infidus was first scientifically described in 1948 by Ole Theodor Jensen Mortensen.

References 

Animals described in 1948
Taxa named by Ole Theodor Jensen Mortensen
Cassidulidae